Natthakrit Insao is a Thai professional footballer.

External links
 

1990 births
Living people
Natthakrit Insao
Association football fullbacks
Natthakrit Insao
Natthakrit Insao
Natthakrit Insao